The Coprobacillaceae are a family of Bacillota.

Phylogeny

The currently accepted taxonomy is based on the List of Prokaryotic names with Standing in Nomenclature (LPSN) and National Center for Biotechnology Information (NCBI)

References

 
Erysipelotrichales
Bacteria families